Feistritz may refer to:

Austria
Deutschfeistritz, in Styria
 Feistritz bei Anger, in Styria
 Feistritz bei Knittelfeld, in Styria
 Feistritz am Wechsel, in Lower Austria
 Feistritz an der Gail, in Carinthia 
 Feistritz im Rosental, in Carinthia 
 Feistritz ob Bleiburg, in Carinthia 
 Maria Buch-Feistritz, in Styria
 Feistritz an der Drau, part of Paternion, in Carinthia
 Feistritz Saddle, a high mountain pass in the Austrian Alps
 , a river in Styria, tributary of the Lafnitz
 Schloss Feistritz (Ilz), a castle named after the river
 , a river in Lower Austria, headwater of the Pitten

Slovenia
 Windisch Feistritz, the German name for Slovenska Bistrica, in Slovenia
 Illyrisch Feistritz, the German name for Ilirska Bistrica, in Slovenia
 Bistrica, Šentrupert, in the Mirna Valley in southeastern Slovenia
 Burg Feistritz, a castle in northeastern Slovenia

See also 
 Battle of Feistritz, 1813
 Bistrica (disambiguation)
 Bistrița (disambiguation)
 Bistritsa (disambiguation)
 Bistritz (disambiguation)
 Bystrica (disambiguation)
 Bystrzyca (disambiguation)
 Gersdorf an der Feistritz, Styria, Austria